Quartz Hill is a census-designated place (CDP) in Los Angeles County, California, United States.  The population was 10,912 at the 2010 census, up from 9,890 at the 2000 census. The name is also shared with the neighboring district areas of its border cities, Palmdale, and Lancaster. Quartz Hill was once home to the Quartz Hill Airport. According to the Greater Antelope Valley Economic Alliance report of 2009, the Palmdale / Lancaster urban area of which Quartz Hill is a part, has a population of 483,998.

Geography
Quartz Hill is located at  (34.652194, -118.220647).

Climate
This region experiences hot and dry summers; average high temperatures during summer exceed 90 °F.  According to the Köppen Climate Classification system, Quartz Hill has a warm-summer Mediterranean climate, abbreviated "Csb" on climate maps.

Demographics

2010
The 2010 United States Census reported that Quartz Hill had a population of 10,912. The racial makeup of Quartz Hill was 8,218 (75.3%) White (62.3% Non-Hispanic White), 795 (7.3%) African American, 142 (1.3%) Native American, 303 (2.8%) Asian, 28 (0.3%) Pacific Islander, 947 (8.7%) from other races, and 479 (4.4%) from two or more races. Hispanic or Latino of any race were 2,689 persons (24.6%).

The Census reported that 10,892 people (99.8% of the population) lived in households, 20 (0.2%) lived in non-institutionalized group quarters, and 0 (0%) were institutionalized.

There were 3,712 households, out of which 1,521 (41.0%) had children under the age of 18 living in them, 1,972 (53.1%) were opposite-sex married couples living together, 573 (15.4%) had a female householder with no husband present, 286 (7.7%) had a male householder with no wife present.  There were 254 (6.8%) unmarried opposite-sex partnerships, and 22 (0.6%) same-sex married couples or partnerships. 692 households (18.6%) were made up of individuals, and 215 (5.8%) had someone living alone who was 65 years of age or older. The average household size was 2.93.  There were 2,831 families (76.3% of all households); the average family size was 3.30.

The population was spread out, with 2,917 people (26.7%) under the age of 18, 1,143 people (10.5%) aged 18 to 24, 2,525 people (23.1%) aged 25 to 44, 3,220 people (29.5%) aged 45 to 64, and 1,107 people (10.1%) who were 65 years of age or older.  The median age was 36.6 years. For every 100 females, there were 97.4 males.  For every 100 females age 18 and over, there were 94.6 males.

The homeowner vacancy rate was 2.0%; the rental vacancy rate was 8.5%.  7,426 people (68.1% of the population) lived in owner-occupied housing units and 3,466 people (31.8%) lived in rental housing units.

According to the 2010 United States Census, Quartz Hill had a median household income of $51,821, with 19.1% of the population living below the federal poverty line.

2000
As of the census of 2000, there were 9,890 people, 3,450 households, and 2,639 families residing in the CDP. The population density was 2,591.9 inhabitants per square mile (999.6/km). The racial makeup of the CDP was 81.47% White, 4.99% African American, 1.13% Native American, 1.84% Asian, 0.24% Pacific Islander, 6.12% from other races, and 4.21% from two or more races. Hispanic or Latino of any race were 15.28% of the population.

There were 3,450 households, out of which 41.5% had children under the age of 18 living with them, 56.8% were married couples living together, 14.1% had a female householder with no husband present, and 23.5% were non-families. 18.8% of all households were made up of individuals, and 5.8% had someone living alone who was 65 years of age or older.  The average household size was 2.86 and the average family size was 3.24.

In the CDP, the population was spread out, with 30.5% under the age of 18, 8.9% from 18 to 24, 27.5% from 25 to 44, 23.7% from 45 to 64, and 9.5% who were 65 years of age or older.  The median age was 35 years. For every 100 females, there were 97.8 males.  For every 100 females age 18 and over, there were 93.6 males.

The median income for a household in the CDP was $49,098, and the median income for a family was $58,125. Males had a median income of $51,136 versus $33,971 for females. The per capita income for the CDP was $22,140.  About 9.1% of families and 11.9% of the population were below the poverty line, including 14.1% of those under age 18 and 13.4% of those age 65 or over.

Community characteristics
Quartz Hill is located in the High Desert of California north of the Los Angeles area. As recently as the 1970s the town was largely agricultural, with cash crops of almonds, alfalfa and turkeys. The almond orchards being crippled by disease and the alfalfa growers having to contend with their water rights being diverted (to a growing Los Angeles) caused a significant shift in the local work force. The shift mainly was toward the nearby aerospace plants of Lockheed Martin and Rockwell International. Its fields long empty, Quartz Hill still celebrates the Almond Blossom Festival every year.

Nearby communities include:

Palmdale—Home of Afro Man, All-4-One, the B-1 Lancer, the B-2 Bomber, the F-117 Fighter, and the Los Angeles County Raceway.
Lancaster—Home of Judy Garland, Frank Zappa, Captain Beefheart, John Wayne, Antelope Valley Fair, Antelope Valley College, and the University of Antelope Valley.
Rosamond—Home of Willow Springs International Raceway, Edwards Air Force Base, and the Exotic Feline Compound.

Education
Quartz Hill schools include Paraclete High School, High Desert Bible College, Quartz Hill Elementary School, Sundown Elementary School, Joe Walker Middle School (students in parts of Quartz Hill go to Del Sur Elementary School in Antelope Acres), and Quartz Hill High School, which is part of the Antelope Valley Union High School District.

Government

The Los Angeles County Department of Health Services operates the Antelope Valley Health Center in Lancaster, serving Quartz Hill.

References

Census-designated places in Los Angeles County, California
Populated places in the Mojave Desert
Geography of Palmdale, California
Census-designated places in California